Jaan Hazir Hai is a 1975 Bollywood film directed by 
Manohar Nath Rangroo.This film produced by Vijay Anand. Prem Kishan, Shekhar Kapoor, Natasha (real name Bilkis Noori), Urmila Bhatt, Iftikhar, Murad, Trilok Kapoor, Ranjan, Jankidas and Komila Virk were a team of film cast. Film released on 1 January 1975.This was the first film of main lead.
Music for the film was given by Jai Kumar Parte.

There were 5 songs in the movie :

1- Arre meri chhammak chhallo (Amit Kumar, Usha Timothy)

2- Sawan Aya badal aaye (Dilraj Kaur)

3- Bhaande phoot jayenge (Amit Kumar, Manhar)

4- Ye shehri mor dekho (Dilraj Kaur, Amit Kumar)

5- Hum na rahenge (Amit Kumar, Manhar, Dilraj Kaur)

All songs were written by the son of popular lyricist Shailendra with the pen name Shaily Shailendra.

Cast
Urmila Bhatt   
Iftekhar   
Jankidas   
Trilok Kapoor   
Shekhar Kapur   
Prem Krishen   
Murad 
Natasha   
Ranjan   
Mohan Sherry
Komilla Wirk

External links
 

1975 films
1970s Hindi-language films